PRUride Philippines is an annual professional road bicycle racing stage race held in the Philippines since 2019. The race is part of the UCI Asia Tour and was classified by the International Cycling Union (UCI) as a 2.2 category race.

Past winners

References

Cycle races in the Philippines
UCI Asia Tour races
Recurring sporting events established in 2019
2019 establishments in the Philippines